Favartia cecalupoi is a species of sea snail, a marine gastropod mollusk in the family Muricidae, the murex snails or rock snails.

Description

Distribution
This marine species occurs in the Indian Ocean off Somalia.

References

 Bozzetti, L., 1993. Description of a new genus Favartia Jousseaume, 1880 (Gastropoda: Muricidae) from the Indian Ocean. Apex 8(1-2): 31-32

Endemic fauna of Somalia
Gastropods described in 1993
Favartia